Orestes Matacena (born August 29, 1941) is a Cuban–American actor, director, producer and writer. His most notable appearance is in the 1994 film The Mask as crime boss Niko.

In 1973, Matacena appeared as Olimpio in the Duo Theatre production Francesco: The Life and Times of the Cencis at La MaMa Experimental Theatre Club in the East Village of Manhattan. The production was written and directed by Manuel Martin, Jr., with music by Enrique Ubieta. Magaly Alabau, who co-founded Duo Theatre with Martin, also appeared in the production.   

He was awarded best actor at the 24FPS International Short Film Festival in 2013. Also in 2013, he received the Ozz Electric Award for best actor at the Vaughan Film Festival in Toronto for the film Caged Dreams.

References

External links

Matacena's page on La MaMa Archives Digital Collections

1941 births
Living people
Cuban male film actors
Cuban film directors
20th-century Cuban male actors
21st-century Cuban male actors